In enzymology, a (+)-sabinol dehydrogenase is an enzyme that catalyzes the chemical reaction

(+)-cis-sabinol + NAD  (+)-sabinone + NADH + H

Thus, the two substrates of this enzyme are (+)-cis-sabinol and NAD, whereas its 3 products are (+)-sabinone, NADH, and H.

This enzyme belongs to the family of oxidoreductases, specifically those acting on the CH-OH group of donor with NAD or NADP as acceptor. The systematic name of this enzyme class is (+)-cis-sabinol:NAD oxidoreductase. This enzyme is also called (+)-cis-sabinol dehydrogenase.

References 

 

EC 1.1.1
NADH-dependent enzymes
Enzymes of unknown structure